Earl of Rothes (pronounced "Roth-is") is a title in the Peerage of Scotland. It was created in 1458 for George Leslie, 1st Lord Leslie. He had already been created Lord Leslie in 1445, also in the Peerage of Scotland. His grandson, the third Earl, having only succeeded his elder brother in March 1513, was killed at the Battle of Flodden on 9 September of the same year. His son, the fourth Earl, served as an Extraordinary Lord of Session. Lord Rothes was also tried for the murder of Cardinal Beaton but was acquitted.

His great-great-grandson, the seventh Earl, was a prominent statesman. He was notably Lord High Treasurer of Scotland from 1663 to 1667 and Lord Chancellor of Scotland from 1667 to 1681. In 1663 he obtained a new charter conferring the earldom of Rothes and lordship of Leslie (which was regranted as Lord Leslie and Ballenbreich), in default of male issue of his own, on his eldest daughter Margaret, wife of Charles Hamilton, 5th Earl of Haddington, and her descendants male and female. It was stipulated in the charter that the earldoms of Rothes and Haddington should never be allowed to merge. In 1680 Lord Rothes was further honoured when he was made Lord Auchmotie and Caskieberry, Viscount of Lugtoun, Earl of Leslie, Marquess of Bambreich and Duke of Rothes, with normal remainder to the heirs male of his body. These titles were also in the Peerage of Scotland.

The Duke had no sons and on his death in 1681 the creations of 1680 became extinct. He was succeeded in the earldom of Rothes and the lordship of Leslie and Ballinbreich according to the charter of 1663 by his daughter Margaret, the eighth holder. Her husband Lord Haddington was succeeded by their second son Thomas (see the Earl of Haddington for more information on this title) while Margaret was succeeded by their eldest son John, the ninth Earl. He assumed the additional surname of Leslie and sat in the British House of Lords as a Scottish Representative Peer between 1708 and 1710. His son, the tenth Earl, was a Lieutenant-General in the Army and notably served as Commander-in-Chief of the Forces in Ireland. From 1723 to 1734 and from 1747 to 1767 he was a Scottish Representative Peer in the House of Lords.

His son, the eleventh Earl, died unmarried at an early age and was succeeded by his eldest sister Jane Elizabeth, the twelfth holder of the titles, despite the rival claim of her uncle Andrew. She was the wife firstly of George Raymond Evelyn, and secondly of Sir Lucas Pepys. Her son by her first husband,  the thirteenth Earl, served as a Scottish Representative Peer from 1812 to 1817. Lord Rothes assumed the surname of Leslie in lieu of Evelyn. He was succeeded by his daughter Henrietta Anne, the fourteenth holder. She was the wife of George Gwyther who along with his wife assumed the surname of Leslie. Their grandson, the sixteenth Earl (who succeeded his father) died unmarried at a young age and was succeeded by his sister Henrietta, the seventeenth holder. She was the wife of the Hon. George Waldegrave, younger son of William Waldegrave, 8th Earl Waldegrave.

They had no children and Henrietta was succeeded by her aunt Mary Elizabeth, the eighteenth holder. She was the second daughter of Henrietta Anne, the fourteenth holder, and the wife of Captain Martin Edward Haworth, who in 1886 assumed for himself and his family by Royal licence the additional surname of Leslie. Their grandson, the nineteenth Earl, sat in the House of Lords as a Scottish Representative Peer between 1906 and 1923. The wife of the 19th Earl, Lucy Noël Martha Leslie, Countess of Rothes, is best known as a survivor of the sinking of RMS Titanic in 1912. His son, the twentieth Earl, was a Scottish Representative Peer from 1931 to 1959.  the titles are held by his grandson, the twenty-second Earl, who succeeded his father in 2005.

The courtesy title used by an heir apparent to the earldom is Lord Leslie.

The Earls of Rothes are the hereditary Clan Chiefs of Clan Leslie

The family seat is Littlecroft, near West Milton, Dorset.

Earls of Rothes (1457) 
 George Leslie, 1st Earl of Rothes (c. 1417–1490)
 George Leslie, 2nd Earl of Rothes (died 1513)
 William Leslie, 3rd Earl of Rothes (died 1513)
 George Leslie, 4th Earl of Rothes (died 1558)
 Andrew Leslie, 5th Earl of Rothes (died 1611)
 John Leslie, 6th Earl of Rothes (died 1641)
 John Leslie, 7th Earl of Rothes (c. 1630–1681)(created Duke of Rothes in 1680)

Dukes of Rothes (1680) 
 John Leslie, 1st Duke of Rothes (c. 1630–1681)

Earls of Rothes (1457; reverted) 
 Margaret Leslie, 8th Countess of Rothes (died 1700)
 John Hamilton-Leslie, 9th Earl of Rothes (died 1722)
 John Leslie, 10th Earl of Rothes (died 1767)
 John Leslie, 11th Earl of Rothes (1744–1773)
 Jane Elizabeth Leslie, 12th Countess of Rothes (1750–1810)
 George William Evelyn-Leslie, 13th Earl of Rothes (1768–1817)
 Henrietta Anne Evelyn-Leslie, 14th Countess of Rothes (1790–1819)
 George William Evelyn Leslie, 15th Earl of Rothes (1809–1841)
 George William Evelyn Leslie, 16th Earl of Rothes (1835–1859)
 Henrietta Anderson Morshead Leslie, 17th Countess of Rothes (1832–1886)
 Mary Elizabeth Leslie, 18th Countess of Rothes (1811–1893)
 Norman Evelyn Leslie, 19th Earl of Rothes (1877–1927)
 Malcolm George Dyer-Edwardes Leslie, 20th Earl of Rothes (1902–1974)
 Ian Lionel Malcolm Leslie, 21st Earl of Rothes (1932–2005)
 James Malcolm David Leslie, 22nd Earl of Rothes (b. 1958)

Present peer
James Malcolm David Leslie, 22nd Earl of Rothes (born 4 June 1958) is the son of the 21st Earl and his wife Marigold Evans-Bevan. He was educated at Eton College and was styled as Lord Leslie in 1975. From 1990 he trained at the John Makepeace School for Craftsmen in Wood, at Parnham House, Beaminster, Dorset.

In 2003 he was living at Littlecroft, West Milton, Dorset. On 15 April 2005, he succeeded as Earl of Rothes (S., 1458) and as Lord Leslie (S., 1445). 

The heir presumptive is Lord Rothes's only brother, Alexander John Leslie (born 1962).

Line of succession (selected)

  Norman Evelyn Leslie, 19th Earl of Rothes (1877–1927)
  Malcolm George Dyer-Edwardes Leslie, 20th Earl of Rothes (1902–1974)
  Ian Lionel Malcolm Leslie, 21st Earl of Rothes (1932–2005)
  James Malcolm David Leslie, 22nd Earl of Rothes (b. 1958)
 (1) Hon. Alexander John Leslie (b. 1962)
 Lady Evelyn Leslie (1929–2011)
 (2) Angela Clare Mackworth-Young (b.1951)
 (3) Susan Charlotte Mackworth-Young (b.1953)
 (4) Lucinda Jane Mackworth-Young (b.1957)
 (5) Hugo William Sells (b.1988)
 (6) Rosanna Mary Sells (b.1991)
 (7) Tessa Natalie Mackworth-Young (b.1959)
 (8) Robin Matthew Hardingham (b.1990)
 (9) Luke Charles Hardingham (b.1993)
 (10) Clara Louise Hardingham (b. 1992)
 Hon. John Wayland Leslie (1909–1991)
 Alastair Pinckard Leslie (b. 1934) 
 Fiona Jane Leslie (b. 1965) 
 Frederick Leslie Blair de Klee (b. 1993) 
 2Lt Lachlan Richard John de Klee (b. 1996) 
 Murray David Robin de Klee (b. 1999) 
 Ann Mary Leslie (b. 1973)
 Amber Elizabeth Leslie (1939–2018)
 Rupert Beresford White (b. 1966)
 Alexander Richard Beresford White (b. 1968)

Gallery of arms

Notes

References
 
 Kidd, Charles, Williamson, David (editors). Debrett's Peerage and Baronetage (1990 edition). New York: St Martin's Press, 1990, 
 

 
Earldoms in the Peerage of Scotland
Peerages created with special remainders
1458 establishments in Scotland
Noble titles created in 1458
Scottish people of Hungarian descent